Golgin subfamily A member 4 is a protein that in humans is encoded by the GOLGA4 gene.

The Golgi apparatus, which participates in glycosylation and transport of proteins and lipids in the secretory pathway, consists of a series of stacked cisternae (flattened membrane sacs). Interactions between the Golgi and microtubules are thought to be important for the reorganization of the Golgi after it fragments during mitosis. The golgins are a family of proteins, of which the protein encoded by this gene is a member, that are localized to the Golgi. This protein has been postulated to play a role in Rab6-regulated membrane-tethering events in the Golgi apparatus. Alternative splice variants have been described but their full-length nature has not been determined.

Interactions
GOLGA4 has been shown to interact with ARL1.

References

Further reading